Sascha Mölders (born 20 March 1985) is a German football manager and player who currently works as a player-coach for Bayernliga club TSV Landsberg.

Career
After spells with various amateur clubs in North Rhine-Westphalia, including Schwarz-Weiß Essen, Mölders was signed by MSV Duisburg in 2006. In his first season playing for Duisburg's reserve team, he scored 24 goals, making him the top goalscorer in the Oberliga Nordrhein. This earned him a place in the first-team squad for the following season, and he made his Bundesliga debut as a substitute for Pablo Cáceres in a 2–1 defeat to Hannover 96. He played a further ten games in the 2007–08 season, but was unable to get on the scoresheet as Duisburg finished bottom of the league and were relegated.

In July 2008, Mölders moved on, joining Rot-Weiß Essen of the Regionalliga West. He scored 28 goals in his first season, more than anyone in the division that year. On 28 January 2010, he signed for FSV Frankfurt of the 2. Bundesliga. He scored three goals in the second half of the 2009–10 season, and fifteen the following season, which has earned him a move to FC Augsburg, newly promoted to the Bundesliga. He scored twice on his Augsburg debut, scoring both of the club's first ever Bundesliga goals and securing a 2–2 draw with SC Freiburg. He scored five goals in 29 appearances in his first season with Augsburg before suffering an injury which ruled him out until November 2012. He scored in each of his first three games after returning to action and ended the season as Augsburg's top scorer with ten goals. He has been less prolific in the 2013–14 season, but in April 2014 he scored the only goal in a 1–0 win over Bayern Munich, ending Bayern's 53-match unbeaten run in the Bundesliga.

On 7 January 2022, Mölders signed a deal with SG Sonnenhof Großaspach for the remainder of the season as a player and co-trainer. He was given the number 33. Only a few months later, on 29 April 2022, it was announced that he would move to Bayernliga club TSV Landsberg for the 2022–23 season as a player-coach.

Career statistics

References

External links

1985 births
Living people
Footballers from Essen
Association football forwards
German footballers
MSV Duisburg players
Rot-Weiss Essen players
FSV Frankfurt players
FC Augsburg players
TSV 1860 Munich players
SG Sonnenhof Großaspach players
Bundesliga players
2. Bundesliga players
3. Liga players
Regionalliga players
Bayernliga players
Association football coaches
German football managers
Oberliga (football) managers